Foundation is a fantasy novel by American writer Mercedes Lackey, published in 2008. It is the first book in The Collegium Chronicles (followed by Intrigues (2010), Changes (2011), Redoubt (2013), and Bastion (2014). It is a depiction of the early history of Valdemar and its timeline is between The Last Herald Mage and Brightly Burning. The book details a change in the training of Heralds from essentially an apprenticeship such as experienced by Tylendel and Vanyel, to a school based system such as the one in Arrows of The Queen and Brightly Burning. Not all Heralds are in favor of this mainly citing lack of supervision as an objection.

Plot
Mag is an enslaved child working alongside other enslaved orphans in the bowels of a gemstone mine. The mine owner, Cole Peters, treats the children with casual brutality, and Mags, orphaned in his early childhood, has known no other life all the way up until a mysterious white horse stampedes into his life. This of course, is Dallen, his Companion, who assists Mags by bringing in another Herald to free him and the children. Their freedom comes on the heels of the arrest of Cole Peters, and Mags is flung into the fray of Haven as a Heraldic Trainee, with no notion of life outside of abject slavery. This, of course, left its scars, and Mags has both no idea of how to function in "normal" society, and no notion of why he so often winds up on the wrong end of trouble. His heavy accent and "stupidity" about such normal things leads to the King's Own taking him under his wing as a spy protégé, but Mags lives in perpetual fear of the bad old days. This fear isn't unjustified, for it seems all of the Heralds are experiencing their own tumultuous changes, as they slowly abandon the old system of apprenticeships which Vanyel learned in, for one of a collegiate style such as what Herald Talia and Herald Elspeth experienced in the time of Arrows of the Queen.

This switch is due to a sudden surge in the numbers of people Chosen, and the accompanying tremendous burdening of the Heraldic, Bardic, and Healer Collegium resources. The crowding is so intense, that Mags is forced to take a room in the Companion's stable. This, on top of his painful social ineptness, sets the stage for a confrontation between Mags and his detractors. Mags, who used to sleep in worse conditions, does not mind being out in the stables, and remains unaware of why so many others do. However, one Herald accuses him of bringing all manner of illicit goods into the room because of his lodging, and nearly attacks him before the Companions intervene. Because of Mags's upbringing he has few friends so he literally does not understand many things most people in the Collegium find to be the utmost of importance, however with Dallen's help he finds two true friends, Lena, a Bardic Trainee, and Bear, a Healer Trainee.

All while this is happening, Mags is trained by the Kings Own in the art of spying, and is assigned to keep an eye on two 'dignitaries' and their retinue of bodyguards and underlings who are visiting and causing trouble. He is also visiting the Guard Archives, in an attempt to find out how he ended up orphaned and enslaved in the first place. There is a suspicion that Mags' parents may have been bandits themselves, a prospect that leaves Mags troubled and desperate to find the actual Guard reports. There, he discovers that Bear has been kidnapped by the supposed dignitaries, and is being kept hostage with a mad man. The dignitaries have been digging through the guard archives, and there they attack Bear who was doing the same thing for personal reasons. Mags ends up rescuing Bear and dispatching the guards.

References

American fantasy novels
Valdemar Universe
2008 American novels
Novels by Mercedes Lackey